James Fitzroy McCarthy (1853–1919) was an Irish surveyor and cartographer who played a prominent role in the delimitation of Thailand (then known as Siam)'s borders in the late nineteenth century, helping transform the country into a modern nation-state. He served as the first Director-General of the Royal Thai Survey Department, which was established in 1885.

Further reading

Irish surveyors
British surveyors
British cartographers
Expatriates in the Rattanakosin Kingdom
British expatriates in Thailand
1853 births
1919 deaths